The Agrarian Party of Turkmenistan is an officially registered political party in Turkmenistan, founded on September 28, 2014.

One of the three officially registered political parties legally existing in Turkmenistan, it is represented in the Assembly of Turkmenistan.

In the 2017 presidential election, the Agrarian Party nominated Durdygylyç Orazow as its candidate. As a result of the elections, Orazow took ninth (last) place among candidates, gaining 1,898 votes (0.06%). In the 2022 presidential election, the party nominated Agajan Bekmyradow who received 7.22% of the vote and achieved third place.

Among the elected deputies, members of the People's Council and local councils, elected on March 25, 2018, there are 3257 representatives of the Democratic Party, 352 from the Party of Industrialists and Entrepreneurs, 1358 from the Agrarian Party, and 2498 independents.

Criticism 
The party supports the policy of President Gurbanguly Berdimuhamedow. According to critics, the party appeared only to create the illusion of multi-party elections.

Election results

Presidential elections

Legislative elections

References 

Agrarian parties
Political parties in Turkmenistan
Political parties established in 2014
2014 establishments in Turkmenistan